The 1904 Northwestern Purple football team was an American football team that represented Northwestern University during the 1904 Western Conference football season. In its second season under head coach Walter McCornack, the team compiled an 8–2 record and finished in a tie for fifth place in the Western Conference. The team's sole losses were to Chicago and conference co-champion Minnesota.

Schedule

References

Northwestern
Northwestern Wildcats football seasons
Northwestern Purple football